Geobius pubescens is a species of beetle in the family Carabidae, the only species in the genus Geobius.

References

Panagaeinae